Tailgunner is an album by organist Jimmy McGriff recorded in 1977 and released on the Lester Radio Corp. (LRC) label.

Reception 

Doug Payne stated: "This 1977 disco production sounds like Jimmy McGriff was added as an afterthought. His distinctive organ fills seem "dropped in" after arrangers Brad Baker and Lance Quinn recorded the rhythm, horn and string sections. Worse, this is some of the weakest music McGriff has ever participated in ... McGriff's only contribution here, the horn-driven "Starlite Ballroom" (featuring notable alto and tenor solos from George Young), makes for some welcome, though out-of-place swing jazz. Otherwise, there's too little that's memorable about Tailgunner

Track listing
All compositions by Brad Baker and Lance Quinn except where noted
 "Tailgunner" – 5:38
 "Bullfrog" (Jerry Friedman) – 5:45
 "Sky Hawk" – 5:58
 "Flexible Flyer" – 6:09
 "Grandma's Toe Jam" – 6:09
 "Starlite Ballroom, Hot Licks Band Stomp" (Jimmy McGriff) – 5:47

Personnel
Jimmy McGriff – organ
Lance Quinn  – guitar, musical supervisor
Brad Baker – conductor
Collective personnel including:
Lew Delgatto, Eddie Daniels, George Young, Alan Rubin, Randy Brecker, John Frosk, Marvin Stamm, John Sheply, Dave Taylor, Barry Rogers, Dominic Menardo, Joe Randazzo – horns
Pat Rebillot, Paul Griffin, Ralph Schuckett – keyboards
Jerry Friedman, Jimmy Ponder – guitar
Bob Babbitt, Will Lee, Francisco Centano – bass
Alan Schwartzberg, Jimmy Young, Ron Zito − drums
Jimmy Maelen, Rubens Bassini – percussion
Al Downing, Denise Wooten, Patricia Johnson – vocals
Gene Orloff, Paul Gerhsman, Guy Lumia, W. Sanford Allen, Harry Lookofsky, Gerald Tarack, Tony Posk, Julian Barber, Richard Maximoff, Jesse Levy, Richard Locker – strings

References

Jimmy McGriff albums
1977 albums
Albums produced by Sonny Lester